The Mahoney Site, designated 20SA193, is an archaeological site located near Bridgeport, Michigan. It was listed on the National Register of Historic Places in 1982.

The site was a Woodland period fall/winter camp.

In 1963, human remains representing at least two individuals were removed from site by archaeologists from the University of Michigan Museum of Anthropological Archaeology.

References

National Register of Historic Places in Saginaw County, Michigan
Archaeological sites on the National Register of Historic Places in Michigan